Snowbears may refer to:
 Utah Snowbears
 Magic City Snowbears